This is a list of episodes of the television series Route 66.

Series overview

Episodes

Season 1 (1960–61)

Season 2 (1961–62)

Season 3 (1962–63)

Season 4 (1963–64)

References

External links
 
 

Lists of American drama television series episodes
U.S. Route 66